Oranienburg is a railway station located in Oranienburg, Germany. The station was opened in 1877 is located on the Berlin Northern Railway and the now closed Nauen–Oranienburg railway and Oranienburg–Velten railway. The train services are operated by Deutsche Bahn and Niederbarnimer Eisenbahn.

History
After the construction of the Wall on August 13, 1961, the S-Bahn line was interrupted to Berlin on the border with West Berlin between Hohen Neuendorf and Berlin-Frohnau, thus travelling alone. Later on, the track of the Berlin outer ring between Hohen Neuendorf and the Karower Kreuz was temporarily provided with a busbar and built an additional connecting curve between outer ring and northern railway at Hohen Neuendorf, so that from 19 November 1961 again a direct S-Bahn traffic to East Berlin was possible. After some restrictions in the early years was possible since the mid-1960s again a continuous 20-minute cycle on the S-Bahn. For decades, the S-Bahn trains from Oranienburg via Birkenwerder, Blankenburg, Ostkreuz to Schönefeld Airport; in the evening and weekend traffic partly to Spindlersfeld.

The rapid-transit railway handled the entire local passenger traffic between Oranienburg and Berlin, other passenger trains stopped because of limited capacities in this relation no more. The passenger trains to the north to various destinations on the northern railway and to the branches in Löwenberg (Mark) routes to Templin and Rheinsberg or Neuruppin began in Oranienburg. In addition, there were some trains between Oranienburg and Hennigsdorf on Birkenwerder and until the suspension of passenger traffic on these routes in the 1960s in the direction of Velten and Nauen Kremmen.

With the expansion of the ports in Rostock and Stralsund, the growing population in the north of the GDR and the increasing tourism, the importance of the Northern Railway and also the Oranienburg station for the long-distance and freight traffic grew. All express trains between Berlin and Rostock or Stralsund via Neubrandenburg stopped at the station; since November 1976 also a Städteexpress train pair.
By the outer ring of Berlin, the bypass railway and the 1950/1951 built links to Basdorf and Velten had lost their meaning. The passenger traffic from Oranienburg via Kremmen to Nauen was discontinued in 1967, the one after Velten in 1969. While the latter line was shut down and dismantled a few years later, the lines to Nauen and Basdorf, which had never had scheduled passenger services, remained in service for freight, as diversion and military strategic reserve until the mid-1990s.

The conversion of the railway systems between Oranienburg and Lehnitz began in 1977. On this section, both the S-Bahn and the mainline ran only a single track. In several stages until 1990, first the S-Bahn (with the exception of a 400 -meter-long section at the station entrance of Oranienburg), then expanded the long-haul double-track. During conversion, the junction of the Nauen bypass was redesigned. While she used to run over the Nordbahn tracks on an overpass and was only connected to her at the Oranienburg station, she subsequently joined the Nordbahn at the same level. The rails between the intersection and the station were removed.

Since 1982, the station was gradually rebuilt. The former platform of the bypass railway became a direction platform for trains to the north. In October 1987, a modern track diagram was inaugurated. On December 15, 1983, the electrical operation between Birkenwerder and Löwenberg (Mark) and thus also in Oranienburg station was added.

In May 1992, the S-Bahn line reopened between Hohen Neuendorf and Frohnau and provides the direct connection from Oranienburg towards the Berlin city center. Since then S1 operates between Oranienburg and Berlin Wannsee. The route to Basdorf has been out of service since 1995 (with the exception of short-term railcar rides in 1998). Also in the mid-1990s, the bypass between Oranienburg and Nauen was shut down. In 2001, this station was heavily renovated.

Train services
The following services currently call at the station:

Regional services  Rostock / Stralsund - Neustrelitz - Berlin - Wünsdorf-Waldstadt - Elsterwerda
Local services  Templin – Löwenberg – Oranienburg – Berlin
Local services  Potsdam – Golm – Hennigsdorf – Oranienburg
Berlin S-Bahn services  Oranienburg – Wittenau – Gesundbrunnen – Friedrichstraße – Potsdamer Platz – Schöneberg – Steglitz – Wannsee

References

External links
Station information 

Berlin S-Bahn stations
Railway stations in Brandenburg
Oranienburg
Buildings and structures in Oberhavel
Railway stations in Germany opened in 1877
1877 establishments in Prussia